Horndon Meadow is a  nature reserve north of Stanford-le-Hope in Essex. It is managed by the Essex Wildlife Trust.

This site is an unimproved hay meadow, which has around eighty flower species, such as green-winged orchids, yellow rattles, musk mallows and black knapweeds. Other plants include adder's tongue ferns.

There is access from South Hill, at Tyelands Farm.

References

 Essex Wildlife Trust